The Nyamal are an Indigenous Australian people of the Pilbara area of north-western Western Australia.

Language
A version of Nyamal became the basis of a pidgin used among workers on pearling luggers in the late 19th century, and was spoken several hundred miles away, as was Ngarluma One Nyamal word has entered English, kaluta, the common term now used to refer to a distinct species of marsupial Dasukaluta Rosamondae, mistakenly classified as an antechinus before it was correctly identified in 1982.

Country
The Nyamal are a coastal people though their traditional lands extend inland through to the Yarrie country of the De Grey River, the name yari denoting the white ochre on the river banks. It extended east of the Karajarri coastal zone, and from Port Hedland through to Marble Bar and Nullagine, south over the Shaw River, and north over the Oakover River to the borders of Martu tribal lands such as those of the Manyjilyjarra, Wanman, Nyangumarta and Ngarla. Norman Tindale estimated their territorial extension as covering .

Bush tucker included mangkurrka cuts from the Punara tree. Two types of kangaroo were hunted, the plain variety (warrinykura) and a hill species (wijunu). The lure of the native fig tee fruit was used to catch both bush turkey, which was trapped in a grass net splayed out in the branches, and emu, which was enticed through an artificial gap in a contrived hedge of bush shrubs, and then fell into spiked ditches dug and then camouflaged with leafage and sand.

History
Part of the traditional Nyamal lands around the de Grey river were taken up by the pastoralist Walter Padbury in 1963, and, after conditions proved too arduous for his foreman Nairn, the station changed hands, and was managed by McKenzie Grant, A.W. Anderson and, later, Charles Harper. Eventually local survivors found work, on the new pastoral leases where a white jackaroo could earn £5 a month. In 1885 they sheared over 13,000 sheep in a month and a half, not paid for in wages, but with flour, sugar and tobacco. Vast flocks of sheep ate up the grasses and bush tucker resources that had been one of the staples of people like the Nyamal, forcing them into more dependence on the stations.

Peter Coppin
Peter Coppin was an elder of the Nyamal whose life story was recorded by Jolly Read before he died. Born near Yarrie Station with the birth-name Karriwarna in 1920, he avoided the fate of many other half-caste (mardamarda or 'red-red' in Nyamal) children in the region, of being kidnapped by the then so-called Protector of Aborigines, a certain Mitchell, and relative of Sir James Mitchell, who, apart from fathering many children on Aboriginal women in the locality, would round up those of mixed descent and take them to the Moore River Native Settlement. His mother shifted him to the Warralong station run by the Hardie brothers, and where the aborigines grew up to be, according to his memory of their repute, the best stockmen in the world.

Notes and references

Notes

References

Aboriginal peoples of Western Australia
Broome, Western Australia